Richard Jareš (born 23 February 1981) is a Czech professional ice hockey defenceman who is currently an unrestricted free agent who most recently played with the Iserlohn Roosters of the Deutsche Eishockey Liga (DEL). He has previously played with HC Litvínov in the Czech Extraliga during the 2010–11 season.

Career statistics

References

External links 
 
 

1981 births
Czech ice hockey defencemen
BK Mladá Boleslav players
ETC Crimmitschau players
HC Berounští Medvědi players
HC Bílí Tygři Liberec players
HC Vlci Jablonec nad Nisou players
IHC Písek players
Iserlohn Roosters players
HC Litvínov players
Living people
Motor České Budějovice players
Orli Znojmo players
Sportspeople from Hradec Králové
Czech expatriate ice hockey players in Germany